Hanna Falk (born 5 July 1989 in Ulricehamn, Sweden) is a Swedish cross-country skier who has competed since 2006. She finished 29th in the individual sprint event at the 2010 Winter Olympics in Vancouver.

She announced her retirement from World Cup cross-country skiing in April 2021.

Cross-country skiing results
All results are sourced from the International Ski Federation (FIS).

Olympic Games

World Championships

World Cup

Season standings

Individual podiums
 4 victories – (3 , 1 )
 11 podiums – (8 , 3 )

Team podiums
 5 podiums – (1 , 4 )

References

External links

 

1989 births
Living people
People from Ulricehamn Municipality
Cross-country skiers from Västra Götaland County
Cross-country skiers at the 2010 Winter Olympics
Cross-country skiers at the 2018 Winter Olympics
Olympic cross-country skiers of Sweden
Swedish female cross-country skiers